Portrait of Imogen is a 1988 American short documentary film about American photographer Imogen Cunningham, directed by Meg Partridge, daughter of Cunningham's son Rondal Partridge. It was nominated for an Academy Award for Best Documentary Short.

References

External links

Portrait of Imogen at the Imogen Cunningham Trust

1988 films
1988 short films
1988 documentary films
American short documentary films
American independent films
Documentary films about photographers
1980s short documentary films
1988 independent films
1980s English-language films
1980s American films